The Gilkey Bridge is a covered bridge in Linn County in the U.S. state of Oregon.  It was added to the National Register of Historic Places as Thomas Creek – Gilkey Covered Bridge in 1987.

Gilkey Bridge and a covered railroad bridge next to it crossed the creek at the former community of Gilkey.

Gilkey was a station on the Southern Pacific Railway line between Crabtree and Shelburn. The station, established in 1880, was named for Allen and William Gilkey. Allen Gilkey came to Oregon in the early 1850s and settled nearby.

Damaged by an overloaded vehicle in 1997, it was closed for repairs, then reopened to traffic in 1998.

Just nine years later, the bridge was damaged again. Scot McKillop, an employee of Fisher Implements, left a service call at a nearby farm and was enroute to Albany when he started to cross the bridge. The hydraulic boom, which had been left extended, snapped power lines before it crashed into the bridge cover. The truck traveled three-quarters of the way across the bridge where it stopped, stuck sideways. There were no injuries, the truck was moved in about 5 hours, and the bridge lost about 50% of its load capacity.

The bridge was rehabilitated in 2017 in a $1.6 million project.

See also
 List of bridges on the National Register of Historic Places in Oregon
 List of Oregon covered bridges

References
5. Alex, Paul (September 19, 2007) "Farm truck damages Gilkey Bridge" Corvallis Gazette Times  Retrieved May 30, 2020.

External links

Bridges completed in 1939
Covered bridges on the National Register of Historic Places in Oregon
Bridges in Linn County, Oregon
Wooden bridges in Oregon
Tourist attractions in Linn County, Oregon
National Register of Historic Places in Linn County, Oregon
Road bridges on the National Register of Historic Places in Oregon
Howe truss bridges in the United States